Ozias Leduc   (October 8, 1864 - June 16, 1955) is one of Quebec's early painters. He was born in Saint-Hilaire-de-Rouville. Leduc produced many portraits, still lifes and landscapes, as well as religious works.

Biography
Leduc was mainly self-taught. Around 1880, he worked with Luigi Cappello, an Italian painter, on church decorations. Around 1881, he was employed at Carli, a manufacturer of statues in Montreal. Around 1883, he worked with Adolphe Rho, decorating another church, this time in Yamachiche. After that, he started working on his own on church decorations. Leduc made a brief trip to Paris and London in 1897 with Suzor-Coté, where he was influenced by the Impressionists. Leduc lived a very solitary life in his home town and was dubbed "the sage of St-Hilaire". He received an Honorary doctorate from the Université de Montréal in 1938. He was made a member of the Royal Canadian Academy of Arts. His legacy includes teaching Paul-Émile Borduas. He died in Saint-Hyacinthe in 1955.

Works

He is best known for his work decorating the Notre-Dame-de-la-Présentation church in Shawinigan South, Quebec, a project which took him thirteen years, until his death. The work was completed by his assistant, Gabrielle Messier. Notre-Dame-de-la-Présentation church was designated a National Historic Site in 2004 and a federal marker reflecting that status was erected at the church in 2005.

Recognition
On May 20, 1988, Canada Post issued 'The Young Reader, Ozias Leduc, 1894' in the Masterpieces of Canadian art series. The stamp was designed by Pierre-Yves Pelletier based on a painting "The Young Student" (1894) by Ozias Leduc in the National Gallery of Canada, Ottawa, Ontario. The painting shows the Ozias Leduc's younger brother, concentrating on a picture book, pencil in hand. The 50¢ stamps are perforated 13 X 13.5 and were printed by British American Bank Note Company.

Leduc was named a National Historic Person on January 12, 2018.

References

Further reading 
 Lacroix, Laurier. Ozias Leduc: Life & Work. Toronto: Art Canada Institute, 2019.

External links

Images and galleries 
 Gallery from the Canadian government's Cybermuse project.
 God Go With You from the Mackenzie Art Gallery.
  Still-life, Study by Candlelight.
  Boy with Bread.
 The Young Student (also known as The Young Reader).

Information 
 Short biography from the Musée National des Beaux-Arts du Québec.
 Very short biography on virtualmuseum.ca's Horizons project.
 Short biography from the Elliott Louis Gallery.
 Biography and information on The Young Reader from Fisheries and Oceans Canada related to a stamp displaying that painting.
 Presentation of Ozias Leduc and his work on the Notre-Dame-de-la-Présentation church.

Criticism and interpretation 
 An interview on Leduc with Laurier Lacroix, professor of art history at the Université du Québec à Montréal, by Compass (a "Jesuit Journal").
 An article (in French) by Michel Clerk about Leduc's contributions to public life.
  The Chapel of the Bishop's Palace in Sherbrooke: Some Preparatory Sketches by Ozias Leduc (in French), by Laurier Lacroix. Also available: a summary in English.
 The Preparatory Drawings for the Decoration of the Baptistry of Notre-Dame Church Montreal (in French), by Jean-René Ostiguy. Also available: a summary in English.
 L'oeuvre déchue (in French), by Stéphane Baillargeon, on Ozias Leduc and the Saints-Anges de Lachine church.

1864 births
1955 deaths
19th-century Canadian painters
Canadian male painters
20th-century Canadian painters
Artists from Quebec
People from Montérégie
Members of the Royal Canadian Academy of Arts
Persons of National Historic Significance (Canada)
19th-century Canadian male artists
20th-century Canadian male artists